is a Japanese footballer who plays for Gamba Osaka in the J1 League. His regular playing position is a winger.

Career

After graduating from Higashi Fukuoka High School, Fukuda joined Gamba Osaka ahead of the 2018 J1 League season and was handed the number 34 jersey.   He made his senior debut on 24 February 2018 in a 3-2 home defeat by Nagoya Grampus in which he was substituted for Shinya Yajima in the 60th minute. In total he played 5 times in his debut season, 3 games in J1 League and 2 in the J.League Cup.   He spent most of 2018 with Gamba U-23 in J3 League scoring 3 times in 22 appearances to help them to 6th place in the final standings.

Career statistics

Last update: 2 December 2018

Reserves performance

Last Updated: 2 December 2018

References

External links

1999 births
Living people
Association football people from Fukuoka Prefecture
People from Kitakyushu
Japanese footballers
J1 League players
J3 League players
Gamba Osaka players
Gamba Osaka U-23 players
Association football midfielders